Together for Peru is a Peruvian centre-left to left-wing political coalition founded with the incumbent registration of the Peruvian Humanist Party.

Formally a registered political party, the coalition participated in the 2021 general election with New Peru's leader, Verónika Mendoza, as presidential nominee. In the aftermath of the unsuccessful presidential run, the coalition endorsed Pedro Castillo's nomination in the runoff against Keiko Fujimori. 

Upon the proclamation of Castillo's victory, Together for Peru was invited to join the new left-wing government led by Free Peru. Currently, the coalition sits as a junior member of Castillo's administration by holding two cabinet positions, being the most prominent the Ministry of Foreign Commerce and Tourism, occupied by the coalition's president, Roberto Sánchez Palomino.

History 
The Together for Peru coalition was founded in 2017 and officially registered as a party by changing the name of the Peruvian Humanist Party instead of registering all of the parties, thus informally composing the union. Alongside Broad Front, both coalitions remain the largest active left-wing coalitions in Peru

2020 snap congressional elections 
At the legislative elections held on 26 January 2020, the party won 4.8% of the popular vote but no seats in the Congress of the Republic. Although, the first projections gave the coalition approximately 5.0% within the margin of error, the party failed to get past the electoral threshold in order to attain representation. In this election, the coalition ran allied informally with the New Peru party led by Verónika Mendoza, as the latter organization did not meet the requirements for party registration.

2021 general elections 
For the 2021 general election, the coalition chose Verónika Mendoza to run in presidential elections, partnering again with New Peru. For congress, the coalition had 130 individuals selected to participate, with the leader Roberto Sánchez choosing to run for being the congressman of Lima. Together for Peru also proposed the inclusion of a referendum in the elections to ask Peruvians if they want a new constitution. Eventually, Mendoza placed sixth in the election with 7.9% of the popular vote. Her loss in support throughout the campaign is widely credited to Pedro Castillo and Yonhy Lescano's voting share in the south of Peru, a traditional stronghold for the Peruvian left. However, in the congressional election, the coalition won 6.6% of the popular vote and gained 5 seats in Congress.

National Executive Committee 
The national executive committee is headed by Roberto Sánchez, from the Humanist Party, the secretary for Political Affairs is César Barrera, from the Communist Party of Peru - Red Fatherland, and that of Trade Union Affairs is Carmela Sifuentes from the Peruvian Communist Party, in addition to six political personalities independent, regional and local leaders, youth, professionals, feminist leaders and union activists.

Among the party's best-known members is former Health Minister Óscar Ugarte.

Ideology and positions 
Together for Peru groups a broad part of the Peruvian left-wing parties that believe that neoliberalism resulted with poverty and inequality in Peru. Overall, Together for Peru leans towards democratic socialism according to EFE. They describe their principles as ensuring equality and equity of all Peruvians, calling for a multicultural society, respecting nature through sustainability and improving tolerance among social groups. The coalition promotes the decentralization of the national government and seeks regional governments to have more authority to increase citizen representation.

Some of the party members consider that Venezuela "is not governed by a dictatorship," taking pro-Maduro positions. However, in particular Verónika Mendoza, leader of New Peru, has expressed: Yes, I can say that Venezuela is a dictatorship. Although I recognize that in New Peru there are different stances. Likewise, Mendoza has declared that "our solidarity is not with Maduro, but with Venezuelans."

Its symbol has red lettering representing Peru's national color and the color of leftist parties while the green represents nature and life.

Members of Together for Peru

Current member parties

Former member parties

Election results

Presidential election

Congressional elections

Regional and municipal elections

References 

2017 establishments in Peru
Left-wing political party alliances
Political parties established in 2017
Political party alliances in Peru
Socialist parties in Peru
Peru